Juan Francisco Marco y Catalán  (24 October 1771 in Bello, Teruel – 16 March 1841 in Rome) was a Spanish Roman Catholic cardinal. He belonged to the Roman Curia.

He was created cardinal in December 1828 by Pope Leo XII.

Catalán participated at the Papal conclave, 1829 which elected Pius VIII, and at the Papal conclave, 1830–1831 which elected Gregory XVI.

References

External links 
 

1771 births
1841 deaths
19th-century Spanish cardinals